Martina Navratilova defeated Chris Evert in the final, 2–6, 6–4, 7–5 to win the ladies' singles tennis title at the 1978 Wimbledon Championships. It was her first major singles title, and the first of an eventual 18 major singles titles and a record nine Wimbledon singles titles.

Virginia Wade was the defending champion, but was defeated in the semifinals by Evert.

This was the first time Wimbledon seeded 16 players for the ladies' championship, increasing the number from 12 the previous year. There have been at least 16 seeds in every Championship since.

Seeds

  Chris Evert (final)
  Martina Navratilova (champion)
  Evonne Goolagong Cawley (semifinals)
  Virginia Wade (semifinals)
  Billie Jean King (quarterfinals)
  Betty Stöve (fourth round)
  Wendy Turnbull (fourth round)
  Dianne Fromholtz (fourth round)
  Tracy Austin (fourth round)
  Kerry Reid (fourth round)
  Marise Kruger (quarterfinals)
  Mima Jaušovec (quarterfinals)
  Virginia Ruzici (quarterfinals)
  Sue Barker (fourth round)
  Regina Maršíková (fourth round)
  Marita Redondo (third round)

As originally published Rosie Casals was seeded 14th and Sue Barker was seeded 16th. The withdrawal of Casals before the draw was made allowed for a redrafting of the seeding list.

Qualifying

Draw

Finals

Top half

Section 1

Section 2

Section 3

Section 4

Bottom half

Section 5

Section 6

Section 7

Section 8

See also
 Evert–Navratilova rivalry

References

External links

1978 Wimbledon Championships – Women's draws and results at the International Tennis Federation

Women's Singles
Wimbledon Championship by year – Women's singles
Wimbledon Championships
Wimbledon Championships